"Boom Shack-A-Lak" is a song by British singer-songwriter and reggae DJ Apache Indian, released in August 1993 and also included on his EP Nuff Vibes. The song gave him his biggest hit in the United Kingdom, reaching number five on the UK Singles Chart. The single and EP were also released worldwide, reaching the top 10 in both Ireland (8) and the Netherlands (10), while reaching the top 20 in Austria (13) and New Zealand (19). The promotional video for the track won the Best Reggae Video award at the 1994 Black Music Awards in London.

Critical reception
Larry Flick from Billboard described the song as "a wacky blend of guttural toasting and retro-pop shuffle beats." He felt that "the hook has the potential to take up permanent residence in your brain, while the fun array of sound effects are sure to get those shoulders shakin' out of control." He also encouraged, "Seek it out and give it a whirl." A reviewer from The Guardian called it a "cute" hit. Andy Beevers from Music Week declared it as "a bouncey Shaggy-style party track that is destined to get plenty of summertime radio play." Tony Cross from Smash Hits gave it five out of five, naming it Best New Single. He wrote, "Trying not to wind your body down to this is like trying not to chew a Rowntree's fruit pastille. Apache's belly-wriggler is fabber than Shabba and shaggier than Shaggy, and his Brummy raggamuffin beat is a dance hall dream come true. Apache invites everybody to join him in one massive ragga party, putting his Bhangra roots on the back burner for the summer. A great record that will surely mean the big time at last for the Apache..."

Track listings
 Nuff Vibes EP
 "Boom Shack-A-Lak" (edit) – 3:48
 "Caste System" (edit) – 3:40
 "Warning" – 4:39
 "Fun" – 4:05

 US, French, and Dutch single
 "Boom Shack-A-Lak" (edit) – 3:48
 "Boom Shack-A-Lak" (instrumental) – 3:48
 "Boom Shack-A-Lak" – 4:31
 "Warning" – 4:39

Charts

Weekly charts

Year-end charts

Certifications

Use in film and television
The song was featured in an Axe advertisement with Jennifer Aniston. The song has also been featured in various Hollywood films: Dumb and Dumber, Dumb and Dumber To, Threesome, Bio-Dome, and more recently Scooby-Doo 2: Monsters Unleashed. The song is also featured in the Bollywood film Anjaam. The song was featured during the introduction for British comedian Greg Davies's 2013 live stand-up show The Back of My Mum's Head. Davies also used it in the second episode of his sitcom Man Down in 2013. In Brazil, the music was part of the "international" soundtracks of TV Globo's telenovela, Olho no olho ("Eye to Eye") in 1993.

References

1993 singles
1993 songs
Dancehall songs
Island Records singles